The Ex Vatican Stradivarius is a cello crafted circa 1620 by Nicolo Amati, master to Antonio Stradivari.  The instrument was originally crafted as a viola da gamba and converted into a cello by Stradivari.

The filigree and paintings on the front and back of the cello were added in the 19th Century by French luthier Georges Chanot. The front depicts two angels, one on either side of the neck; one is playing a harp and the other is playing a tambourine. The back side of the cello shows a Vatican flag and Papal hat, flanked by two dolphins.

Currently the instrument is played by the young Swiss cello virtuoso, Nadège Rochat.

References
 Wendy Sutter's Homepage
 Article on Sutter's Recent Solo Work
 Article in the Swiss newspaper Le Temps
 Home page of Nadège Rochat

Stradivari cellos
Stradivari instruments